The Kettle Moraine State Forest is a state forest in southeastern Wisconsin. The chief feature of the reserve is the Kettle Moraine, a highly glaciated area. The area contains very hilly terrain and glacial landforms, such as kettles, kames and eskers. The  forest is divided into two large and three small units, which are spread across a hundred miles.

The forest includes  of hiking trails, almost  of cross-country ski trails,  of equestrian trails,  of snowmobile trails,  of off-road bicycle trails including  of singletrack trail, and 750 campsites.

All units include a portion of the Ice Age National Scenic Trail and most units have horse/snowmobile trails. Several areas of trail loops for hiking, biking and skiing can be found in the northern and southern units.

Kettle Moraine Scenic Drive is a  scenic route that winds across southeastern Wisconsin, and through all five forest units.

Forest units

The Northern Unit is located in western Sheboygan County, southeastern Fond du Lac County and northern Washington County. It is over twenty miles (32 km) long, and extends from just outside Glenbeulah, on the north end, southward to just east of Kewaskum. The Forest Headquarters is located in Campbellsport. Features of the Northern Unit are Greenbush Recreation Area, with a group camping area and hiking trails; Parnell Observation Tower; Long Lake Recreation Area, with a campground, a beach and boat launch; Henry S. Reuss Ice Age Visitor Center; Spruce Lake Bog; Saint John Evangelical Lutheran Church; and Mauthe Lake Recreation Area, with a campground.

The Southern Unit extends from just west of North Prairie. It is southwest of Whitewater Lake, and south of Whitewater. Other nearby towns include Eagle and Palmyra. Features of the Southern Unit include Ottawa Lake Recreation Area which has boating, campgrounds and hiking and ski trails, and Whitewater Lake Recreation Area, which also features camping and boating. The Forest is host to Old World Wisconsin, a collection of farmsteads, recreating the homes and lives of settlers, and also to the McMiller Sportsmen Center, public hunting practice ranges.
The Pike Lake Unit is on the eastern side of  Pike Lake. It is located on state Highway 60 in between Slinger and Hartford. The park offers camping, hiking, biking and swimming, and has an observation tower overlooking the park and lake.
The Loew Lake Unit is a small recreation area located in the town of Erin, on the Oconomowoc River and Loews Lake in southwestern Washington County. It offers hiking, hunting and horse riding.
Lapham Peak Unit is south of Delafield in Waukesha County.
The Mukwanago River Unit is in Waukesha and Walworth Counties, adjacent to the Mukwonago River.

See also
 List of Wisconsin state forests

References

External links

  Wisconsin Department of Natural Resources
 Northern Unit
 Southern Unit
 Pike Lake Unit
 Loew Lake Unit
 Lapham Peak Unit
 Mukwonago River Unit
 

 
Wisconsin state forests
Ice Age National Scientific Reserve
Nature centers in Wisconsin
Kames
Protected areas of Fond du Lac County, Wisconsin
Protected areas of Jefferson County, Wisconsin
Protected areas of Sheboygan County, Wisconsin
Protected areas of Walworth County, Wisconsin
Protected areas of Washington County, Wisconsin
Protected areas of Waukesha County, Wisconsin
Protected areas established in 1936